Le Tronquay may refer to two communes in Normandy, France:

Le Tronquay, Calvados
Le Tronquay, Eure